Francis Finlay,  (6 August 1926 – 30 January 2016) was an English stage, film and television actor, Oscar-nominated for a supporting role as Iago in Laurence Olivier's 1965 film adaptation of Othello. 
In 1983, Finlay was directed by Italian filmmaker Tinto Brass in the erotic classic The Key, with Stefania Sandrelli.
His first leading television role came in 1971 in Casanova. This led to appearances on The Morecambe and Wise Show. He also appeared in the drama Bouquet of Barbed Wire.

Early life
Finlay was born in Farnworth, Lancashire, the son of Josiah Finlay, and Margaret Finlay. He was educated at St Gregory the Great School, but left at 14 to train as a butcher at Toppings, gaining a City and Guilds Diploma in the trade.

Stage career
Finlay made his first stage appearances at the local Farnworth Little Theatre, in plays that included Peter Blackmore's Miranda in 1951. The current Little Theatre president, also in the cast of that Miranda production, remembers him as a perfectionist in his craft. He also played in repertory, initially in Scotland, before winning a scholarship to RADA in London.

There followed several parts in productions at the Royal Court Theatre, such as the Arnold Wesker trilogy. He became particularly associated with the National Theatre, especially during the years when Laurence Olivier was director. Playing Iago opposite Olivier's title character in John Dexter's 1965 production of Othello, and the film adaptation of that production (also 1965), Finlay's performance left theatre critics unmoved, but he later received high praise for the film version and gained an Academy Award nomination. The critic John Simon wrote that the close-ups in the film allowed Finlay to give a more subtle and effective performance than he had done on stage.

At the Chichester Festival Theatre, Finlay played roles ranging from the First Gravedigger in Hamlet to Josef Frank in Weapons of Happiness. He also appeared in The Party, Plunder, Saint Joan, Hobson's Choice, Amadeus (as Salieri), Much Ado About Nothing (as Dogberry), The Dutch Courtesan, The Crucible, Mother Courage, and Juno and the Paycock.

Finlay made appearances on Broadway, in Epitaph for George Dillon (1958–1959), and in the National Theatre and Broadway productions of Filumena opposite Joan Plowright in 1980. Between November 1988 and April 1989, Finlay toured Australia, performing in Jeffrey Archer's Beyond Reasonable Doubt at theatres in Sydney, Melbourne and Adelaide.

Screen

One of his earliest television roles was in the family space adventure serial Target Luna (1960), as journalist Conway Henderson. Finlay's first major television success was as Jean Valjean in the BBC's 1967 ten-part adaptation of Victor Hugo's Les Misérables. He played the title role of Dennis Potter's BBC 2 series Casanova (1971). Following this, he portrayed Adolf Hitler in The Death of Adolf Hitler (1972) for London Weekend Television.

Finlay portrayed Richard Roundtree's nemesis, Amafi, in the film Shaft in Africa (1973), before playing Porthos for director Richard Lester in The Three Musketeers (also 1973), The Four Musketeers (1975) and The Return of the Musketeers (1989). He appeared in several additional films, including The Wild Geese (1978) and The Key by Tinto Brass.

Finlay starred as the father in the once-controversial Bouquet of Barbed Wire (1976), and its sequel Another Bouquet (1977), and he was reunited with his Bouquet of Barbed Wire co-star, Susan Penhaligon, when he played Professor Van Helsing in the BBC's Count Dracula (also 1977), with Louis Jourdan. He appeared in two Sherlock Holmes films as Lestrade, solving the Jack the Ripper murders (A Study in Terror, 1965, and Murder by Decree, 1979). He also played a role as the primary antagonist in an adaptation of "The Golden Pince-Nez" of the Granada Television series of Sherlock Holmes starring Jeremy Brett, in which his son Daniel played a minor role as well. Finlay appeared on American television in A Christmas Carol (1984) playing Marley's Ghost opposite George C. Scott's Ebenezer Scrooge. He also guest-starred as a farcical witch-smeller in an episode of The Black Adder ("Witchsmeller Pursuivant", 1983), opposite Rowan Atkinson.

In 1994 he played Howard Franklin in fourth-series Heartbeat episode "Lost and Found". 

Finlay played Sancho Panza opposite Rex Harrison's Don Quixote in the 1973 British made-for-television film The Adventures of Don Quixote, for which he won a BAFTA award. He won another BAFTA award that year for his performance as Voltaire in the BBC TV production of Candide.

Finlay played the role of Justice Peter Mahon in the award-winning New Zealand television serial Erebus: The Aftermath (1988). In the Roman Polanski film The Pianist (2002), he took on the part of Adrien Brody's father. He starred alongside Pete Postlethwaite and Geraldine James in the BBC drama series The Sins in 2000, playing the funeral director "Uncle" Irwin Green. He appeared in the TV series Life Begins (2004–2006) and as Jane Tennison's father in the last two stories of Prime Suspect (2006 and 2007). In 2007, he guest-starred in the Doctor Who audio adventure 100. Finlay appeared in November 2008 in the eleventh episode of the BBC drama series Merlin, as "Anhora, Keeper of the Unicorns".

Private life and honours
Finlay met his future wife Doreen Shepherd when both belonged to Farnworth Little Theatre. They and three children, Stephen, Cathy, and Daniel, lived in Shepperton, Middlesex. She died in 2005 aged 79. As a Roman Catholic, Finlay became a member of the British Catholic Stage Guild (now the Catholic Association of Performing Arts).

Finlay was made a Commander of the Order of the British Empire in the New Year's Honours of 1984 and an honorary doctor of the University of Bolton in 2009.

Finlay died on 30 January 2016 at his home in Weybridge, Surrey, England, aged 89, from heart failure.

Partial filmography
{|class="wikitable"
|- style="background:#B0C4DE;"
! Year
! Title
! Role
! Notes
|-
|rowspan=4|1962
|Life for Ruth
|Henry – Teddy's father
|
|-
|The Longest Day
|Private Coke
|Uncredited
|-
|The Loneliness of the Long Distance Runner
|Booking Office clerk
|Uncredited
|-
|Private Potter
|Captain Patterson
|
|-
|rowspan=2|1963
|Doctor in Distress
|Corsetiere
|
|-
|The Informers
|Leon Sale
|
|-
|rowspan=2|1964
|Hot Enough for June
|British Embassy porter
|Uncredited
|-
|The Comedy Man
|Prout
|
|-
|rowspan=3|1965
|A Study in Terror
|Inspector Lestrade
|Reprised the role fourteen years later in Murder by Decree
|-
|The Wild Affair
|Drunk
|
|-
|Othello
|Iago
|San Sebastián International Film Festival Award for Best ActorNominated — Academy Award for Best Supporting ActorNominated — BAFTA Award for Most Promising Newcomer to Leading Film RolesNominated — Golden Globe Award for Best Supporting Actor – Motion Picture
|-
|rowspan=2|1966
|The Sandwich Man
|Second fish porter
|
|-
|The Deadly Bees
|H.W. Manfred
|
|-
|rowspan=4|1967
|The Jokers
|Harassed man
|
|-
|Robbery
|Robinson
|
|-
|I'll Never Forget What's'isname
|Chaplain
|
|-
|The Spare Tyres
|Council foreman
|Short
|-
|rowspan=3|1968
|Inspector Clouseau
|Superintendent Weaver
|
|-
|The Shoes of the Fisherman
|Igor Bounin
|
|-
|Twisted Nerve
|Henry Durnley
|
|-
|rowspan=2|1970
|The Molly Maguires
|Davies
|
|-
|Cromwell
|John Carter
|
|-
|rowspan=2|1971
|Assault
|Det. Chief Supt. Velyan
|
|-
|Gumshoe
|William Ginley
|
|-
|rowspan=3|1972
|Sitting Target
|Marty Gold
|
|-
|Danny Jones
|Mr. Jones
|
|-
|Neither the Sea Nor the Sand
|George Dabernon
|
|-
|rowspan=2|1973
|Shaft in Africa
|Amafi
|
|-
|The Three Musketeers
|Porthos / O'Reilly
|
|-
|1974
|The Four Musketeers
|Porthos
|Sequel to The Three Musketeers
|-
|1977
|Count Dracula
|Abraham Van Helsing
|TV movie
|-
|1978
|The Wild Geese
|Father Geoghagen
|
|-
|rowspan=2|1979
|Murder by Decree
|Inspector Lestrade
|
|-
|
|Paul
|aka Satan's Wife
|-
|rowspan=2|1982
|The Return of the Soldier
|William Grey
|Nominated — BAFTA Award for Best Actor in a Supporting Role
|-
|Enigma
|Canarsky
|
|-
|rowspan=3|1983
|The Ploughman's Lunch
|Matthew Fox
|
|-
|The Black Adder
|The Witchsmeller Pursuivant
|Episode: "Witchsmeller Pursuivant"
|-
|The Key
|Nino Rolfe
|
|-
|rowspan=2|1984
|Sakharov
|Kravtsov
|TV movie
|-
|A Christmas Carol
|Jacob Marley's Ghost 
|TV movie
|-
|rowspan=2|1985
|1919
|Sigmund Freud
|Voice
|-
|Lifeforce
|Dr. Hans Fallada
|
|-
|1987
|Casanova
|Razetta
|TV movie
|-
|1988
|Erebus: The Aftermath|Justice Peter Mahon
|TV Mini-Series
|-
|1989
|The Return of the Musketeers|Porthos
|Final film in the Musketeers trilogy
|-
|1990
|King of the Wind|Edward Coke
|
|-
|rowspan=2|1992
|Cthulhu Mansion|Chandu
|
|-
|Stalin|Sergei Alliluyev
|TV movie
|-
|1993
|Sparrow|Father Nunzio
|
|-
|1995
|Gospa|Monsignor
|
|-
|1996
|Tiré à part|John Rathbone
|
|-
|rowspan=4|1997
|For My Baby|Rudi Wittfogel
|
|-
|So This Is Romance?|Mike's dad
|
|-
|The Road to Glory|Yudah Lieb Gold
|
|-
|Put K Slave|
|
|-
|1998
|Stiff Upper Lips|Hudson Junior
|
|-
|1998–1999
|How Do You Want Me?|Astley Yardley
|10 episodes
|-
|1999
|Dreaming of Joseph Lees|Father
|
|-
|2000
|Ghosthunter|Charlie Fielding
|Short
|-
|2000
|The Sins|'Uncle' Irwin Green
|BBC drama series
|-
|2001
|The Martins|Mr. Heath
|
|-
|rowspan=2|2002
|The Pianist|Samuel Szpilman
|
|-
|Silent Cry|Dr. Robert Barrum
|
|-
|rowspan=3|2003
|Eroica|Joseph Haydn
|TV movie
|-
|The Statement|Commissaire Vionnet
|
|-
|The Lost Prince|H.H. Asquith
|TV movie
|-
|rowspan=2|2004
|Lighthouse Hill|Alfred
|-
|Life Begins|Eric
|ITV Series
|-
|2007
|The Waiting Room|Roger
|
|-
|2008
|Merlin|Anhora
|Episode: "The Labyrinth of Gedref"
|}

References

External links

Obituary at the Bolton News'' [1 February 2016] Retrieved 7 February 2016.

1926 births
2016 deaths
Alumni of RADA
Best Actor BAFTA Award (television) winners
Commanders of the Order of the British Empire
English male film actors
English Roman Catholics
English male stage actors
English male television actors
People from Farnworth
Actors from Bolton
People from Shepperton
Trustees of the British Museum
Male actors from Lancashire
Male actors from Surrey
20th-century English male actors
21st-century English male actors